Barbara Friedman (born September 1, 1949) is an American politician who served in the California State Assembly from 1991 to 1996.

References

1949 births
Living people
Democratic Party members of the California State Assembly
Politicians from Los Angeles